Westfield is a city in Hamilton County, Indiana, United States. As of the 2010 census the population was 30,068, and in 2020 the population was 46,410. Westfield is in the Indianapolis metropolitan area.

History 
Westfield was founded on May 6, 1834, by North Carolina Quakers Asa Bales, Ambrose Osborne and Simon Moon. It is believed that the town was planned as a stop on the Underground Railroad with many families of the Religious Society of Friends and the Wesleyan Methodist Church supporting the cause. When the laws against aiding escaped slaves were made harsher, part of the Westfield Quaker Friends Meeting House split into the Anti-Slavery Friends meeting.

Westfield was incorporated as a town in 1849.

On January 1, 2008, Westfield was incorporated as a city, and Andy Cook was sworn in as mayor. With recent annexations in southern Washington Township and rapid population growth in areas previously within the town limits, the city population in 2010 (30,068) was more than triple that of 2000 (9,293). Because of the growing size of the city, officials are planning a major revitalization of city's downtown. New additions to downtown Westfield are expected to include a new library and city hall.

Westfield recently annexed the community of Jolietville into its borders.

The Union High Academy Historic District was listed on the National Register of Historic Places in 1995.

In 2014, the city opened Grand Park Sports Complex which hosted the 2016 Big Ten Conference Men's Soccer Tournament.

Demographics

As of 2000 the median income for a household was $52,963; and for a family, $65,208. Males had a median income of $45,388; females, $26,864. The per capita income was $22,160. About 2.3% of families and 4.0% of the population were below the poverty line, including 2.5% of those under 18 years and 3.7% 65 years or over. The American Community Survey estimated the median household income in Westfield from 2007 to 2011 at $86,054 and the median family income at $96,374.

2010 census
As of the census of 2010, there were 30,068 people, 10,490 households, and 8,146 families residing in the town. The racial makeup of the town was 90.9% White, 2.2% African American, 0.2% Native American, 2.5% Asian, 2.6% from other races, and 1.6% from two or more races. Hispanic or Latino of any race were 5.8% of the population.

There were 10,490 households, of which 47.0% had children under the age of 18 living with them, 64.9% were married couples living together, 9.3% had a female householder with no husband present, 3.4% had a male householder with no wife present, and 22.3% were non-families. 18.0% of all households were made up of individuals, and 4.6% had someone living alone who was 65 years of age or older. The average household size was 2.85 and the average family size was 3.27.

The median age in the town was 33.7 years. 31.9% of residents were under the age of 18; 5.9% were between the ages of 18 and 24; 31.6% were from 25 to 44; 23.7% were from 45 to 64; and 6.8% were 65 years of age or older. The gender makeup of the town was 48.9% male and 51.1% female.

Local media
Westfield is served by a local weekly newspaper, the Current in Westfield. The area is also served by the Times of Noblesville and the daily Hamilton County Reporter from the neighboring county seat of Noblesville.

Grand Park
Grand Park is the largest youth sports campus in the United States, featuring 26 baseball and softball diamonds, 31 multipurpose fields for soccer, football, field hockey and lacrosse. An indoor events center opened in July 2016 that features three full-size multipurpose fields, and an indoor basketball/volleyball facility that features eight courts, with two of them being NBA-regulated, also opened and is named after the NBA's Indiana Pacers.

Since opening, the campus has hosted several major events including the following: Whale of a Sale Consignment Event, Little League Softball and Baseball Region Tournaments, USA Archery Finals, Big Ten Women's and Men's Soccer Tournaments, US Club Soccer NPL Finals and Nationals, Suburban Indy Consumer Shows, plus many more.

In 2017 Westfield signed a 10-year contract with the NFL's Indianapolis Colts for their annual training camp.

The park has experienced about 750,000 visitors and 1,900,000 visits on average each year.

Geography
Westfield is located in western Hamilton County at  (40.032266, -86.129015). It is bordered to the east by Noblesville and to the south by Carmel. To the west it is bordered by Zionsville in Boone County.

U.S. Route 31 is the main highway through the city, leading north  to Kokomo and south  to Interstate 465, the beltway around Indianapolis. Indiana State Road 32 is Westfield's Main Street and leads east  to Noblesville, the county seat, and west  to Lebanon.

Notable people
 Herb Baumeister, suspected serial killer
 Claude Bowers, writer, Democratic politician, and ambassador to Spain and Chile
 Joey Chestnut, competitive eater
 Martha Doan, chemist and academic
 Thomas Jefferson Lindley, Civil War veteran, Indiana state representative and senator
 Ryan Pepiot, Major League Baseball pitcher (Los Angeles Dodgers), Westfield High School graduate
 Kevin Plawecki, Major League Baseball catcher (Boston Red Sox), Westfield High School graduate
 Seth Cook Rees, pastor and leading figure in the evangelical Holiness movement
 Ambrose J. Tomlinson, first general overseer of the Church of God
 Eriq Zavaleta, professional soccer player (Toronto FC)

Education

Public
 Westfield High School (Grades 9–12)
 Westfield Middle School (Grades 7–8)
 Westfield Intermediate School (Grades 5–6)
 Carey Ridge Elementary School (Grades K-4)
 Maple Glen Elementary School (Grades K-4)
 Monon Trail Elementary School (Grades K-4)
 Oak Trace Elementary School (Grades K-4)
 Shamrock Springs Elementary School (Grades K-4)
 Washington Woods Elementary School (Grades K-4)

Private
 Montessori School of Westfield
 St Maria Goretti School (Grades PreK-8)
 Union Bible College and Academy

 Options Charter School(Grades 7-12)

Colleges and universities 
Union Bible College and Seminary

Public library
The town has a lending library, the Westfield-Washington Public Library.

Sports 
Westfield hosts the Great Lakes Regional Tournament in the Little League World Series each year. The tournament is held at the Grand Park Sports Campus.

Westfield also has a contract with the NFL's Indianapolis Colts to host their yearly Training Camp at the Grand Park Sports Campus.  This began in 2018, and the contract is for 10 years.

References

External links
 
 City of Westfield official website
 Westfield Washington Schools
 Westfield-Washington Historical Society

Cities in Hamilton County, Indiana
Cities in Indiana
Populated places established in 1834
Populated places on the Underground Railroad
Indianapolis metropolitan area
Underground Railroad in Indiana
1834 establishments in Indiana